Ermine and Rhinestones is a 1925 silent film, written by Louise Winter, and directed by Burton L. King

Synopsis
Billy Kershaw, the son of a manufacturer in a small western town, comes to New York City on business. He becomes engaged to wealthy Peggy Rice, a member of the modern jazz set, who prefers to "play the field" with other men. Sometime before, Billy had sent Jim Gorman to jail for theft, causing Gorman's girl, Minette Christie, to leave town. At a fashion show, Peggy persuades Billy to buy her an ermine wrap, trimmed with rhinestones, which is modeled by a girl who turns out to be Minette. Billy realizes that Peggy is no more than a gold digger and breaks the engagement. Gorman shows up and attempts to kill Minette, for he believes she turned him in. Billy, however, defeats Gorman in a fight, and at the very last minute saves Minette from being gassed to death in her apartment. Billy comes to realize that Minette is the girl for him.

Cast
 Edna Murphy as Minnette Christie
 Niles Welch as Billy Kershaw
 Ruth Stonehouse as Peggy Rice
 Coit Albertson as Pierce Ferring
 Sally Crute as Alys Ferring
 Bradley Barker as Jim Gorman
 Marguerite McNulty as 	Nita Frost

External links

1925 films
American black-and-white films
1925 drama films
American silent feature films
Films directed by Burton L. King
Silent American drama films
1920s American films
1920s English-language films